Noordodes is a genus of moths of the family Crambidae.

Species
Noordodes magnificalis (Rothschild, 1916)
Noordodes purpureoflava Hampson, 1916

References

Natural History Museum Lepidoptera genus database

Odontiinae
Crambidae genera
Taxa named by George Hampson